"Heaven" is the fifth Japanese single from South Korean girl group After School. The single was released physically on October 2, 2013, but was released digitally on September 25, 2013. The track is produced by Shinichi Osawa. This is the first Japanese release with new member Kaeun, and the first Japanese release without former leader Park Kahi.

Background
After releasing the group's fourth single in June 2012, the group focused on preparing for their Korean comeback in June 2013 with "First Love," which later becomes the second b-side for "Heaven." In August, the group announced it would return to Japan with its fifth single, "Heaven," to be released in October. The single is to be released in three versions: CD only edition (Type C), CD & DVD edition (Type A) and CD & Photobook (Type B) edition. The photobook edition includes photos of After School by the Harajuku-based photographer Yonehara Yasumasa, who also produced the album arts.

Music video
The music video for "Heaven", directed by Tanabe Hidenobu, was released on August 24, 2013. The music video opens with members' pole dancing, a skill they learned for their Korean promotions of First Love. The video then transitions into first person perspective of a man who gets up from the floor as if becoming sober. The video transitions into clips of After School, suggesting the man is reminding himself of preceding events. After the dance break, the video returns to the perspective of the man, who is shown to dine and drink. After it shows the choreography once again, the video proceeds into rapid scene changes, which ends with the man falling on the floor in the room, whose lights are turned out.

Track listing

Chart performance

Oricon chart

Billboard charts

Release history

References

2013 singles
2013 songs
Avex Trax singles
After School (band) songs
Hybe Corporation singles